Andrew Waller is an American film director. He has directed the films Taking Five and American Pie Presents: Beta House, both of which were released in 2007. Prior to directing, he worked as a photographer on the short films Liquid (2001), Hairless (2004) and Miracle Mile (2004). In 2005, he directed and wrote the short film Candy Paint. He also worked as a location assistant on the 1996 film Mr. Wrong starring Ellen DeGeneres and Bill Pullman.

References

External links

American film directors
Living people
Place of birth missing (living people)
Year of birth missing (living people)